Ocean Voyager is a small cruise ship, carrying about 200 passengers.  First launched in 2001, she has been operated by four different owners, and was formerly known as Victory I, Saint Laurent, Sea Voyager and Cape May Light, the ship was built in the United States and entered service in 2001.
 
She was renamed Ocean Voyager in December 2021.

Design and description
The ship has a gross tonnage of 4,954 tons and a deadweight tonnage of 200 tons.

Characterized by her owners as a "luxury" vessel, she has a capacity of 210 passengers that are bunked in 105 double staterooms, and are said to have available all the amenities offered on larger vessels.

Construction and career
The vessel was laid down in August 1999 by Atlantic Marine at their Jacksonville, Florida, shipyard. The ship was constructed under the yard number 4242 and was launched in June 2000. Cape May Light was completed on 9 April 2001.

Career as Cape May Light

Initially named Cape May Light, in 2010 she was renamed Sea Voyager and registered in the United States. In 2011, her registry was changed to Nassau, Bahamas and later that year and in 2015 her named was changed to Saint Laurent.

Career as Saint Laurent

When she was named Saint Laurent she was owned by the Clipper Group AS, of Copenhagen, Denmark and operated by the Haimark Line.

On 18 June 2015, on the first season she toured the Great Lakes, Saint Laurent collided with the Eisenhower Lock, a canal lock in the Saint Lawrence Seaway. The vessel has a capacity for 210 passengers, and, on the day of the collision, she was carrying 192 passengers, 81 crew, and a local pilot. Twenty-two members of the ship's complement, nineteen passengers and three crew members were slightly injured, and were evacuated.

After the collision the vessel took on water, so the lock was completely drained. The collision caused the seaway to be out of commission for 42 hours, and delayed 13 other vessels. Nine hours after the seaway was reopened another vessel, ran aground.

Career as Victory I

The ship was the first vessel of a new line, currently known as Victory Cruise Lines, was acquired in 2016.
She underwent a refit, repurposing four of her double cabins, reducing her passenger capacity to 202 from 210.
Her sister ship, formerly Cape Cod Light was acquired in 2017, similarly refit, and recommissioned as Victory II. During the covid pandemic the Victory I was pulled from service due to the cruising ban the Victory I was laid up at Port Royal South Carolina.

Career as Ocean Voyager

On December 7, 2021, the Victory I was renamed Ocean Voyager. She underwent a small refit at Port Royal. Ocean Voyager returned to service on January 4, 2022, doing cruises around the Yucatán Peninsula and returning to Great Lakes service in May, making her first stop in Chicago on June 8.

See also

References

Cruise ships of the United States
2000 ships